Miss Julie is a 1922 German silent drama film directed by Felix Basch and starring Asta Nielsen, William Dieterle, and Lina Lossen. It was based on August Strindberg's 1888 play Miss Julie.

Plot
Julie, a young noble woman is drawn to a senior servant, a valet named Jean, who is particularly well-traveled, well-mannered and well-read.

Cast
Asta Nielsen as Julie
William Dieterle as Jean, Waiter
Lina Lossen as The Countess
Arnold Korff as The Count
Käthe Dorsch as Christine, Kitchen Maid
Olaf Storm as The Bridegroom
Georg H. Schnell as The Friend
Ernst Gronau

Production and release
Miss Julie passed the film censorship on 24 November 1921 and premiered on 2 February 1922 at the Marmorhaus. The five-act play was 1589 meters long.

The film's sets were designed by the art directors Robert Herlth and Walter Röhrig.

References

External links

Films of the Weimar Republic
Films directed by Felix Basch
German silent feature films
German films based on plays
Films based on works by August Strindberg
German black-and-white films
German drama films
1922 drama films
National Film films
Works based on Miss Julie
Silent drama films
1920s German films
1920s German-language films